Mahiga is a Location in Nyeri County of Kenya's Central Province.

 Munyange Two (0 km)
 Ihithe (3.7 km)
 Githerere (3.7 km)
 Githugi (3.7 km)
 Munyange One (3.7 km)
 Njigari (3.7 km)
 Gathuthi (5.2 km)
 Huguini (5.2 km)
 Kihome (5.2 km)
 Gatumbiru (7.4 km)
 Konyu (7.4 km)
 Hatha-ini (7.4 km)
 Mahiga (7.4 km)
 Wandumbi (8.2 km)
 Kairuthi (8.2 km)
 Kagioini (8.3 km)
 Githakwa (10.5 km)
 Gathumbi (10.5 km)
 Ichagichiru (11 km)
 Kihuri (11.1 km)
 Kabebero (11.1 km)
 Kagundu (11.7 km)
 Kigogo-ini (11.7 km)
 Gaturi (11.7 km)
 Ihuririo (11.7 km)
 Kihome (11.7 km)
 Kagonye (11.7 km)

References 

Populated places in Central Province (Kenya)